Ezekiel Samuel Candler Jr. (January 18, 1862 – December 18, 1944) was a United States representative from Mississippi. He was the nephew of Milton A. Candler and cousin of Allen Daniel Candler. He was born in Belleville, Florida. Later, he moved with his parents to Tishomingo County, Mississippi in 1870. He attended the common schools and Iuka Male Academy and was graduated from the law department of the University of Mississippi at Oxford in 1881. He was admitted to the bar the same year and commenced practice in Iuka, Mississippi.

Candler served as chairman of the Democratic executive committee of Tishomingo County, Mississippi in 1884. He moved to Corinth, Mississippi in 1887 and continued the practice of law. He was member of the Democratic executive committee of Alcorn County, Mississippi for several years.

Candler was elected as a Democrat to the Fifty-seventh and to the nine succeeding Congresses (March 4, 1901 – March 3, 1921). In Congress, he served as chairman, Committee on Alcoholic Liquor Traffic (Sixty-seventh Congress). He was unsuccessful candidate for renomination in 1920, losing to John E. Rankin. After leaving Congress, he resumed the practice of his profession. He served as mayor of Corinth, Mississippi 1933-1937 and died there in 1944. He was buried in Henry Cemetery.

References

1862 births
1944 deaths
People from Corinth, Mississippi
Democratic Party members of the United States House of Representatives from Mississippi
Mayors of places in Mississippi
People from Iuka, Mississippi